Pahrianwali is a town in Mandi Bahauddin District in the Punjab province of Pakistan. It is located at 32°28'60N 73°46'0E at an altitude of 215 metres (708 feet). The village is part of Phalia tehsil. It is one of the biggest and populous town in Punjab. It has all served as central business district town surrounding villages and has its own union council, post office, playground, bazaar, rural health centre, veterinary hospital, government operated boys and girls schools and colleges school. Pahrianwali also has several privately operated schools.
Choudhry Riaz Asghar and Basma Riaz are two notable political personalities of Pahrianwali.
Pahrianwali has also produced doctors, engineers, army officers, public servants, judicial servants and lawyers. Majority of people are settled overseas and this trend is on the rise.

References

Villages in Phalia Tehsil
Villages in Mandi Bahauddin District
Union councils of Mandi Bahauddin District